Susan Y. Bookheimer is a professor of clinical neuroscience at UCLA School of Medicine. She is best known for her work developing brain imaging techniques to help patients with Alzheimer’s disease, autism, attention deficit hyperactivity disorder, brain tumors, and epilepsy.

Achievements and awards 
Bookheimer was the Chair of Organization for Human Brain Mapping in 2012–2013. In 2018 Bookheimer has received the Glass Brain lifetime achievement award presented by the Organization for Human Brain Mapping. She holds Joaquin M. Fuster Distinguished Professor position on Dept. Psychiatry and Biobehavioral Sciences, UCLA School of Medicine.

Research 
Bookheimer contributed to understanding of Alzheimer's disease by investigated a common polymorphism, APOE-4, a risk gene for Alzheimer’s Disease. Her work showed that normal volunteers who differ in their possession of the risk polymorphism had different brain activation patterns from APOE-4 carriers.

Bibliography

References

External links 

- https://www.semel.ucla.edu/autism/team/susan-bookheimer-phd

Living people
American women neuroscientists
American neuroscientists
Cornell University alumni
David Geffen School of Medicine at UCLA faculty
Year of birth missing (living people)
American women academics
21st-century American women